The Hédéa was a French automobile manufactured in Paris from 1912 until 1924.  Built by a M. Accary, and sometimes sold under his own name, they were medium-sized cars with 1795 cc Chapuis-Dornier engines.

References

Defunct motor vehicle manufacturers of France
Manufacturing companies based in Paris